"Jesus Loves Me" is a Christian hymn written by Anna Bartlett Warner (1827–1915). The lyrics first appeared as a poem in the context of an 1860 novel called Say and Seal, written by her older sister Susan Warner (1819–1885), in which the words were spoken as a comforting poem to a dying child. The tune was added in 1862 by William Batchelder Bradbury (1816–1868). Along with his tune, Bradbury added his own chorus "Yes, Jesus loves me, Yes, Jesus Loves me..." After publication as a song it became one of the most popular Christian hymns in churches around the world, especially among children.

Poem by Anna Bartlett Warner
As originally published in 1860, it appeared in four stanzas, as follows:

Hymn by William Batchelder Bradbury

Bradbury's Golden Shower of S.S. Melodies: a new collection of hymns and tunes for the Sabbath school, edited by Wm. B. Bradbury, New York, 1862:

History
In 1943 in the Solomon Islands, John F. Kennedy's PT-109 was rammed and sunk. Islanders Biuku Gasa and Eroni Kumana who found Kennedy and the survivors remember that when they rode on PT boats to retrieve the survivors, the Marines sang this song with the natives, who had learned it from Seventh-day Adventist missionaries.

This hymn was titled "China" in some hymnals of the 19th century. Some early hymnals, such as The Modern Hymnal (1926) explain this title with a subtitled note that says, "The favorite Hymn of China". By the time of later hymnals such as the Baptist Hymnal (1956), the subtitle had been dropped and the tune was simply called "CHINA".

Revised versions
The poem and the hymn, or portions of them, have sometimes been revised. Some examples of this are

The book Jack Bauer's Having a Bad Day presented a version which alternated Yes, Jesus Loves Me with ... Loves Us and Loves You.
A message presented in the book Good Morning Message builds on the line refrain as follows: "Yes, Jesus loves me ... Yes, Jesus loves you ... allow Him to help you through your day, every day. ..."
The inspirational book From Chains to Change presented a version in which the line "Little ones to Him belong" was rendered as "Little ones to Him below".

Notable performances
The song has been recorded by a large number of different artists, either obscure or famous. Some versions include the following:
1972: Ray Stevens on Turn Your Radio On
1980: John Fahey on Yes! Jesus Loves Me
1975: Bobby Womack on I Don't Know What the World Is Coming To
1991: Jim Eanes and Bobby Atkins on Heart of the South
1992: Whitney Houston on The Bodyguard soundtrack
1994: Shanice on 21...Ways to Grow
1997: Brenda Lee on Precious Memories
1998: Bob Carlisle on Butterfly Kisses & Bedtime Prayers
2000: Rosemary Clooney on Many a Wonderful Moment
2000: Aaron Neville on Devotion
2001: Destiny's Child on Survivor
2004: CocoRosie on La Maison de Mon Rêve (a parody denouncing American Christianity)
2006: Alabama on Songs of Inspiration
2008: Dionne Warwick on Why We Sing
2012: Whitney Houston and Kelly Price; Houston's last performance in an impromptu duet at a nightclub
2022: Tennessee State University Aristocrat of Bands on The Urban Hymnal, the first album by a college marching band to win a Grammy

See also 
Christian child's prayer

Notes

American Christian hymns
1860 songs
Whitney Houston songs
Songs about Jesus
Songs based on poems
English children's songs
Public domain music
Songs written by William Batchelder Bradbury